Christophe Gans (born 11 March 1960) is a French film director, producer, and screenwriter who specializes in horror and fantasy movies.

Life and career
Gans was born in Antibes, France. As a teenager, he spent a large portion of his time creating kung fu-themed Super 8 movies with his friends. He later went on to attend the French film school Idhec, where he created his first short film, Silver Slime, dedicated to Mario Bava. He later spent time as a film critic before co-directing his first film, H.P. Lovecraft's: Necronomicon.

His $29 million-budgeted film Le Pacte des Loups was a worldwide success, grossing over $70 million  in theaters worldwide. It became the sixth-highest-grossing French-language film of all time in the United States, After the film's success, many producers approached Gans to work on very similar projects to appeal to young audience.

He went on to direct 2006's cinematic adaptation of the video game Silent Hill, as well as the 2014 fantasy film, Beauty and the Beast. Gans has also appeared in films as an actor, as he portrayed himself in the 2016 mockumentary Fury of the Demon.

Future projects
Gans was to write and direct the Capcom video game Onimusha; however, after several setbacks he abandoned it and is now attached to the French film Fantômas. He initially was to direct a sequel to Silent Hill, but later pulled out and was replaced by M. J. Bassett. Gans was developing a new live action Corto Maltese film for release in 2020. It was to star Tom Hughes and Milla Jovovich. However, it was cancelled due to legal problems. In January 2020, Gans expressed an interest in directing new Silent Hill and Fatal Frame films, stating that he is developing a screenplay for the former.

In 2022, in an interview with French gaming website Jeux Video, Gans confirmed that he had completed a script for a third Silent Hill film, and is aiming for a 2023 release for the project. He later reiterated this in an interview with JeuxActu, and elaborated that the third film project is to be part of what will be a 'relaunch' of the Silent Hill brand, accompanied by new video games. In October 2022, it was announced that the film would be called Return to Silent Hill and would be based on Silent Hill 2.

Filmography
Short film

Feature film

Producer
 Saint Ange (2004)

Notes

External links

BBC interview
Yahoo.com Interview

1960 births
Fantasy film directors
French film directors
French screenwriters
Horror film directors
Living people
People from Antibes